The East Kent Railway (EKR) is a heritage railway in Kent, England. It is located at Shepherdswell station on the London and Chatham to Dover mainline. The line was constructed between 1911 and 1917 to serve the Kent Coalfields. See East Kent Light Railway for details of the original lines. The Kent Collieries were mostly a failure with only Tilmanstone on the line producing any viable commercial coal and commercial traffic over the line.
The line is operated by heritage diesel locomotives. It is home to a collection of heritage diesel locomotives, Diesel Multiple Units DMU, DEMU and electric multiple units including an in service British Rail Class 404 built in the 1930s.

At Shepherdswell, there is a cafe, a large  woodland area with walking routes, a  gauge miniature railway, a  gauge woodland miniature railway, a model railway and a small museum.

At Eythorne, there is a small cafe in a General Utility Van built by BR that used to carry elephants. The old Selling Signal Box is also here with a history of the East Kent Railway both past and present inside. Eythorne Station plays host to a variety of features on special event days.

The railway holds special events throughout the year, ranging from railway enthusiast events to beer festivals along with family fun weekends.

The tunnel was built in typical Colonel Stephens style by building double track portals but only excavating a single track internally to save money.

Rolling stock

Steam Locomotives 
Avonside  No. 2004 'St. Dunstan'. Previously Located at British Coal Snowdown.  Undergoing cosmetic restoration and on static display.
Peckett and Sons  No.2087 'Achilles'. Privately owned but based at the railway long term.

Diesel Locomotives 
Vanguard  No. 01543. Previously used at MOD Kineton. Arrived May 2016. In Service.
Vanguard  No. 01546. Previously used at MOD Kineton. Arrived April 2016. In Service.
Class 08  No. 08502. Privately owned. In Service.
Class 08  No. 08676. Ex EWS, Privately owned. Arrived October 2016. In Service.
Class 08  No. 08865. Ex EWS, Privately owned.
Fowler  No. 416002 'Snowdown'. Previously located at British Coal Snowdown. In Service. (Privately Owned)
Ruston  LSSH No. AD427 'The Buffs' and 'The Royal Engineers 9th Field Squadron'. Works No. 466616.  In service. (Privately owned)
English Electric  No. D1197 'Richborough Castle'.  Out of use due to engine problems.

Diesel Multiple Units 
BR 2H DEMU no. 205001.  In Service, on passenger trains, and restoration to BR Blue livery. Currently the unit is out of service and being refurbished. The unit was also involved in the Cowden Crash of 1994 but was luckily not damaged. 
In May 2020 a BR class 142 Pacer "142 036" retired by Northern will be preserved by the East Kent Railway and run on the heritage railway along with sister unit "142 017" which is already at the heritage railway. Both units will be used on running days when passenger numbers are low.

Electric stock 
 4-COR Driving Motor Brake Third Saloon 11182 from u.3142.
 4-COR Driving Motor Brake Third Open 11161 from u.3142.
 4-VEP Driving Trailer Composite Lavatory 76875 from u.3545 In regular use 
 4-VEP Driving Trailer Second Open Lavatory 76397 from u.3905.
 4-VEP Driving Trailer Second Open Lavatory 76398 from u.3905.
 4-VEP Trailer Second Open 70904 from u.3905.
 4-CIG Motor Brake Second Open 62385 from u.1399.
 457 Driving Motor Standard Open 67300 from u.7001.
365 Driving Motor Second Open (B) 65974 from 365540
365 Driving Motor Second Open (A) 65917 from 365524
365 Tourist Second Open 72287 from 365524

Hauled coaches
LMS Brake Corridor Third 5793, in use as Model Railway Coach. (Privately Owned) 
BR Mk.1 Gangwayed Full Brake 80785, in use as Model Railway Coach. 
BR Mk.1 Brake Second 43140 (under-frame only), In use as Rail Carrier.
BR Mk.2 Brake First Corridor 14123. (In Service) 
BR Mk.2 Restaurant First Open 1215. (In Service - Privately Owned) 
Pullman SECR 43 Parlour First "Sapphire". (Privately Owned) 
Pullman SECR 99 Parlour First "Padua". (Privately Owned)
Pullman SECR 102 Kitchen First "Rosalind". (Privately Owned)

There is also a wide variety of wagons at Shepherdswell.

The EKR today as a Heritage Railway

A preservation group was formed in 1987 to preserve part of the abandoned line as far as the old coal mine at Tilmanstone. By 1989 a majority of the lineside vegetation had been cleared and by 1995 the first heritage train was run.

Following the reopening of the railway, a new platform was constructed on the site of the former equivalent at Eythorne and the former signalbox from Selling was moved to the northern end of the platform in the mid 1990s. The railway also owns the Barham Signal Box from the closed  Elham Valley Line which houses a detailed mural painting of the old East Kent Railway route, this can be found at Shepherdswell.

The EKR operates on most Sundays and Bank Holidays between April and September and selected Saturdays in mid summer.

The EKR also owns an extensive ancient woodland known as "The Knees". The railway uses The Knees as an educational resource, woodland walks - the bluebells in spring are a popular attraction and for special events such as halloween.

The railway hosts other groups, including the Southern Electric Group, EKR Trolleybus Group and the 427 Locomotive Group and recently the Network SouthEast Railway Society as they have moved their Museum Container.

The railway hosts two apprenticeship schemes for Permanent Way and Civil Engineering training.

References

External links 

 East Kent Railway website
 East Kent Railway photos by volunteer Damon Cox
 Colonel Stephens Railway Museum page on the East Kent Light Railway
 Southern Electric Group
 Network SouthEast Railway Society
 www.shepherdswellwithcoldredpc.kentparishes.gov.uk

Heritage railways in Kent
Dover District
Standard gauge railways in Kent